The 2025 Asian Indoor and Martial Arts Games, officially known as the 7th Asian Indoor and Martial Arts Games and also known as Riyadh 2025, is scheduled to be a pan-Asian multi-sport event in indoor and martial arts sports held in Riyadh. It will mark the first time that Saudi Arabia was scheduled to host an OCA event and will be a test for the 2034 Asian Games.

Bidding process
On 21 November 2021, the Olympic Council of Asia announced that Saudi Arabia will host the 2025 Asian Indoor and Martial Arts Games.

References

See also
2029 Asian Winter Games
2034 Asian Games

Asian Games, Indoor and Martial Arts
Asian Games, Indoor and Martial Arts
Asian Games, Indoor and Martial Arts 2025
Asian Games, Indoor and Martial Arts
2025
International sports competitions hosted by Saudi Arabia